"Feigned madness" is a phrase used in popular culture to describe the assumption of a mental disorder for the purposes of evasion, deceit or the diversion of suspicion. In some cases, feigned madness may be a strategy—in the case of court jesters, an institutionalised one—by which a person acquires a privilege to violate taboos on speaking unpleasant, socially unacceptable, or dangerous truths.

Modern examples

To avoid responsibility
 Vincent Gigante, American Mafia don, was seen wandering the streets of Greenwich Village, Manhattan in his bathrobe and slippers, mumbling incoherently to himself, in what he later admitted was an elaborate act.
 Allegedly, Shūmei Ōkawa, Japanese nationalist, on trial for war crimes after World War II.
 Garrett Brock Trapnell, a professional thief and confidence man, frequently pretended to be affected by schizophrenia or dissociative identity disorder in order to be sent to mental institutions rather than prison for his crimes. This strategy eventually failed when he was brought to trial for aircraft hijacking. He was later the subject of a book by Eliot Asinof, entitled The Fox Is Crazy Too.

To examine the system from the inside
Investigative journalists and psychologists have feigned madness to study psychiatric hospitals from within:
 American muckraker Nellie Bly; see Ten Days in a Mad-House (1887)
 The Rosenhan experiment in the 1970s also provides a comparison of life inside several mental hospitals.
 The Swedish artist Anna Odell created the project Okänd, kvinna 2009-349701 to examine power structures in healthcare, the society's view of mental illness and the victimhood imposed on the patient.

Historical examples 
 Lucius Junius Brutus, who feigned stupidity, causing the Tarquins to underestimate him as a threat until the time when he was able to drive the Roman people to insurrection.
 Alhazen, who was ordered by the sixth Fatimid Caliph, al-Hakim, to regulate the flooding of the Nile; he later perceived the insanity and futility of what he was attempting to do and, fearing for his life, feigned madness to avoid the Caliph's wrath. The Caliph, believing him to be insane, placed him under house arrest rather than execute him for failure. Alhazen remained there until the Caliph's death, thereby escaping punishment for his failure to accomplish a task that had been impossible from the beginning.
 Kamo, a Bolshevik revolutionary, successfully feigned madness when in a German prison in 1909, and then in a Russian prison in 1910.
 Ion Ferguson, an Irish psychiatrist in the British Army in a World War II German prisoner-of-war camp, successfully feigned madness to get himself repatriated. He also assisted two other prisoners in doing the same.

In fiction and mythology
 
 Shakespeare's Hamlet, who feigns madness in order to speak freely and gain revenge—possibly based on a real person; see Hamlet (legend).
 Odysseus feigned madness by yoking a horse and an ox to his plow and sowing salt<ref>the story does not appear in Homer, but was apparently mentioned in Sophocles' lost tragedy The Mad Ulysses: James George Frazer, ed., Apollodorus: Library, Epitome 3.7:footnote 2; Hyginus, Fabulae 95 mentions the mismatched animals but not the salt.</ref> or plowing the beach. Palamedes believed that he was faking and tested it by placing his son, Telemachus right in front of the plow. When Odysseus stopped immediately, his sanity was proven.
 "Feign madness but keep your balance" is one of the Thirty-Six Stratagems
 One Flew Over the Cuckoo's Nest, Randle McMurphy feigns insanity in order to serve out his criminal sentence in a mental hospital rather than a prison.
 In Henry IV by Luigi Pirandello, the main character feigns insanity.
 In Goodbyeee, the last episode of BBC sitcom Blackadder, Blackadder feigns madness to try to avoid being sent into battle.
The protagonist of the film Shock Corridor is a journalist who fakes insanity in order to gain access to an institution.
 In Ricochet, Denzel Washington plays an assistant district attorney who feigns madness to catch a criminal by extraordinary means. He remarks: "Going insane, it's strangely liberating, isn't it?"
Another notable example is Primal Fear, adapted from the William Diehl novel of the same name. In the film, Martin Vail (Richard Gere) defends a timid, young altar boy named Aaron Stampler (Edward Norton) accused of murdering an Archbishop. Halfway through, Vail discovers Stampler has dissociative identity disorder, with one sociopathic personality called "Roy," who was responsible for killing the Archbishop. However, after Stampler is released due to plea of insanity, Vail discovers Stampler faked the disorder in order to avoid execution. The film was Edward Norton's debut, which earned him an Oscar nomination for Best Supporting Actor.
Jose Manalo and Wally Bayola's roles in Scaregivers feigned madness by eating peanut butter disguised as stool samples, which landed them in a mental facility.
In Colditz'', a British television series about prisoners-of-war in WWII Germany, Wing Commander George Marsh feigns madness as a way of escaping. He successfully convinces his captors that he is insane and is duly repatriated. But there is a twist: after his return to Britain, Marsh becomes genuinely insane.

See also 
Münchausen syndrome
Malingering

References 

David and king Achish
Lucius Junius Brutus
Hamlet

Criminal law
Factitious disorders